The Swamp Terrorists were a Swiss electro-industrial music group that was formed in 1988 by STR, Ane H, and Francis H. Their music is harsh pounding electro-industrial/industrial hip hop beats, turntables and occasional rapping mixed with grinding metal guitar riffs (which are usually sampled from other heavy metal bands), and produces a sound similar to Die Warzau, KMFDM and White Zombie.

History
'Swamp Terrorists' were a Swiss electro-industrial music group that was started in the late 1980s by synthesizer programmer STR, (of Band Berne Crematoire, Nacht-Raum, and Strangler of the Swamp fame), vocalist Ane Hebeisen (aka Ane H), (formerly of Tierstein) and guitarist Francis H. Francis H departed from the group after the release of their first EP He is Guilty, after which Ane and STR recorded their first album Grim – Stroke – Disease together and released it on the Machinery/Noise label in 1991. About a year later, it was followed by Grow – Speed – Injection.

Shortly after the 1994 album Combat Shock, Swamp Terrorists added several members for their live show: bassist Anrej A, guitarist Spring and drummer Piet Hertig. The band had a dedicated following in Brazil, where they have toured and where their international fan club was based.

STR left the band immediately following the 1995 release Killer, and began to work with the guitar-heavy Hellsau. The other four members of the band, as well as STR's live replacement ND, have since released a live album, Five in Japan and 2 EPs: Wreck in 1997, and Rare & Unreleased in 1999, on Metropolis Records. The band has been inactive since.

Discography

Discography 
Studio albums
 Grim – Stroke – Disease (1990, Machinery)
 Grow – Speed – Injection (1991, Machinery)
 Combat Shock (1993, Alfa International/Contempo)
 Killer (1996, Metropolis)

Live albums
 Five in Japan (1997, Metropolis)

Compilation albums
 Rare & Unreleased (1999, Metropolis)

EPs
 He Is Guilty (1989, 150 BPM)
 Nightmare (1991, Noise)
 The Pale Torment EP (1994, Sub/Mission)
 The Get O. EP (1994, Sub/Mission)
 Dive-Right Jab: The Remixes (1995, Sub/Mission)
 Wreck (1996, Metropolis)

Singles
 "Rebuff!" (1991, Machinery)

Compilation appearances
Trans Europa (A Swiss - Swedish Techno-Compilation) – (LP) 1989, Side A, Track #5 "Old Greyhound" - 150 BPM Records • (CD) 1989, Track #5 "Old Greyhound" - 150 BPM Records
How To Use Machinery – (CD) 1991, Track #2 "So Sweet - It's Painful" - Machinery
Tekk-Banger's Ball – (2xCD) 1992, Disc #2, Track #4 "Ratskin" - ZYX Records
Funky Alternatives 7 – (CD) 1993, Track #3 "Rebuff (Exclusive Mix) " - Concrete Productions
Grid Slinger – (LP) 1993, Side B, Track #1 "Come Back" - Re-constriction Records, Cleopatra
How To Use Machinery II – (CD) 1993, Track #9 "Skizzo Pierce" and Track #11 "The Vault" - Machinery
Terror - An Industrial Metal Compilation – (CD) 1993 Track #6 "Braintrash" - Mental Decay • (2xLP) 1993, Side B, Track #3 "Braintrash" - Mental Decay
Trans Europa 2 (Swiss-Italian Techno-Crossover) – (CD) 1993, Track #6 "Cynic Forage (Remix)" - 150 BPM Records
Chaos Compilation – (CD) 1994, Track #8 "Get O. (LP Mix)" - COP International
Helvetic Art Compilation – (CD) 1994, Track #4 "Liberator" - Hall of Sermon
The Digital Space Between – (CD) 1994, Track #11 "Pale Torment (Convert Single Remix)" - Hard Records
Dion Fortune Sampler Vol. IV – (2xCD) 1995, Disc #1, Track #4 "Dicksmoker" - Dion Fortune
Frostbyte – (CS, Promo) 1995, Side A, Track #2 "Come Back" and Side B, Track #1 "Liberator" - Re-constriction Records
Magnetic Submission – (CD) 1995, Track #9 "Dive-Right Jab" - Musica Maxima Magnetica, Sub/Mission Records
New Industries – (CD) 1995, Track #9 "Braintrash" - Dynamica
Apocalypse Now 1 – (2xCD) 1996, Disc #1, Track #3 "Dive-Right Jab (Til You Drop)" - Sub Terranean
Built For Stomping – (CD, Promo) 1996 - Track #14 "Liberator" - Re-constriction Records, Cleopatra
Elektrauma Vol. 3 – (CD) 1996, Track #8 "Wreck (U.S. Version)" - 	Discordia
Funky Alternatives - Best of Volume One to Eight – (CD, Box) 1996, Track #11 "Rebuff (Exclusive Mix)" - Concrete Productions, Indigo
Industrial Revolution: 3rd Edition Rare & Unreleased – (2xCD) 1996, Disc #1, Track #13 "Dive-Right Jab (Till You Drop)" - Cleopatra
Sound-Line Vol. 4 – (CD) 1996, Track #9 "Shape of Rage" - Side-Line
Sweet Sub/Mission – (CD) 1996, Track #1 "Dive-Right Jab ('Til You Drop KMFDM Remix)" and Track #2 "Rebel Shade (Rough Edit)" - Sub/Mission Records
'Sweet Sub/Mission Vol. 1 – (CD) 1996, Track #1 "Dive-Right Jab ('Til You Drop KMFDM Remix)" and Track #2 "Rebel Shade" -  Fifth Colvmn Records
The Digital Space Between Vol. 3 – (CD) 1996, Track #6 "Get O. (Twisted Mix) - Cleopatra
Industrial Virus – (3xCD, Box) 1997, Disc #2, Track #3 "Rebuff (Remix) - Dressed to Kill
Minimal Synth Ethics 4 – (CD) 1997, Track #3 "Try My Flesh (Visceral Penetration)" - Cri Du Chat
More Exclusive Alternatives – (CD) 1997, Track #8 "Rebuff" - Cleopatra
Industrial Hazard – (3xCD, Box) 1998, Disc #2, Track #3 "Rebuff (Remix)" - Dressed to Kill
Five Years of Electronic Tears – (2xCD) 1999, Disc #2, Track #3 "Pale Torment (Convert Single Mix)" - Cyberware Productions
Machines and Noise (Volume 2) – (CD) 2002, Track #5 "Rebuff" - Mastertech Pty Ltd.

References

External links 

Musical groups established in 1986
Musical groups disestablished in 1999
1986 establishments in Switzerland
1999 disestablishments in Switzerland
Swiss industrial music groups
Electronic body music groups
Electro-industrial music groups
Swiss industrial metal musical groups
Swiss industrial rock musical groups
Rap metal musical groups
Metropolis Records artists
Re-Constriction Records artists
Noise Records artists